Film awards season is an annual time period between November and February every year, in the United States, where a majority of significant film award events take place. In October ballots are sent out to voters, to collect nominations for the first award ceremonies, which are usually the Governors Awards or the independent Gotham Awards, to begin awards season in November. The season usually culminates in the Academy Awards in late February or early March (the latter in Winter Olympics years). In 2021, the season ended with the delayed Academy Awards ceremony on April 25, 2021, due to the COVID-19 pandemic, with many other ceremonies and film festivals moving up their dates, in return.

Though they only cover film scores and soundtrack albums/songs within their honors, several music awards, including the American Music Awards and Grammy Awards, are also presented during the same film awards season to provide television networks additional event programming.

List of film awards ceremonies

October
 Location Managers Guild Awards
 Saturn Awards

November
 Gotham Awards
 People's Choice Awards
 Hollywood Film Awards

December
 National Board of Review
 New York Film Critics Circle
 Los Angeles Film Critics Association

January
 National Society of Film Critics
 Critics' Choice Movie Awards
 Golden Globe Awards
 Producers Guild of America Awards
 Screen Actors Guild Awards

February and March
 Annie Awards
 Directors Guild of America Awards
 Satellite Awards
 British Academy Film Awards
 Writers Guild of America Awards
 Independent Spirit Awards
 Golden Raspberry Awards
 USC Scripter Awards
 Academy Awards
 Nickelodeon Kids' Choice Awards

List of film awards seasons
 2006–07 film awards season
 2012–13 film awards season
 2013–14 film awards season
 2014–15 film awards season
 2015–16 film awards season
 2016–17 film awards season
 2017–18 film awards season
 2018–19 film awards season
 2019–20 film awards season

American film awards
Seasons